Sonia Kreitzer (born September 19, 1984), known by her stage name Doe Paoro, is an American singer-songwriter based in Los Angeles, California, United States, whose ethereal sound blends elements of pop, dubstep, soul, and R&B and bears strong influence of Lhamo, a vocally acrobatic, centuries-old Tibetan folk opera tradition. Her debut album, Slow to Love, which Paoro composed while isolated in a cabin near her hometown of Syracuse, New York, was released on February 14, 2012. She was named an artist to watch by Stereogum shortly thereafter.

Her second album, After, was released through ANTI- on September 25, 2015 to critical acclaim.

Career 
A self-taught pianist and vocalist, Paoro trained in Lhamo while traveling alone through the Himalayas. During this period, she also spent several weeks practicing silent meditation, which allowed her to reflect on the "space between silence and sound." Her cover of Baltimore synthpop band Future Islands' "Little Dreamer" was released in December 2011; original singles "Can't Leave You" and "Born Whole" followed in January 2012. In 2013, Paoro released two songs on a 7" through White Iris Records.

Paoro has performed at Bonnaroo, SXSW, Osheaga, and CMJ, as well as numerous venues throughout the U.S., She often opens her live performances with an a cappella Tibetan prayer, and credits Vipassanā meditation with having a strong influence over the themes explored in her work, which include attachment, detachment, compassion, and disconnection from the human experience.

"Hypotheticals", Paoro's first track released through ANTI-, was featured on Season 4 of Girls. NPR's All Songs Considered listed Paoro on their Six Musical Discoveries You Can't Miss list.

She has been compared to Fiona Apple, James Blake, Adele, and Lykke Li, among others.

2018–present: Soft Power
On 19October 2018, Paoro released her third studio album, Soft Power. The album was crafted in London with producer Jimmy Hogarth and features Leo Abrahams on guitar. The record was recorded live to tape and is an exploration of power dynamics.

Voice
Paoro possesses the vocal range of a contralto.

References

External links

1984 births
Living people
21st-century American women singers
American women pop singers
American women singer-songwriters
American indie pop musicians
American indie rock musicians
American contraltos
People from Fayetteville, New York
Fayetteville-Manlius High School alumni
21st-century American singers
Singer-songwriters from New York (state)
Anti- (record label) artists